Tamburello is an Italian surname. Notable people with the surname include:

 Ben Tamburello (born 1964), former American football guard and center 
 Paolo Tamburello, Canadian politician 
 Daniel Tamburello, politician

Fictional characters
 Chris Tamburello, fictional character of the MTV's reality television series The Real World: Paris

See also 
 Tamburi (surname)

Italian-language surnames